Méndez Núñez or Mendez-Nuñez may refer to: 

Mendez, Cavite, officially the Municipality of Mendez-Nuñez, a fourth-class urban municipality in the province of Cavite, Philippines
Casto Méndez Núñez (1824–1869), Spanish naval officer
Spanish ironclad Méndez Núñez, a wooden-hulled armored frigate
Spanish cruiser Méndez Núñez, a 
Spanish destroyer Mendez Nunez (D63), a Gearing-class destroyer, former USS O'Hare (DD-889)
Spanish frigate Méndez Núñez (F104), an Álvaro de Bazán-class frigate